Kenneth James Brown (born 11 July 1967) is an English former professional footballer and current football manager. As a player, he played for Norwich City, Plymouth Argyle, West Ham United, Huddersfield Town, Reading, Southend United, Crystal Palace, Reading, Birmingham City, Millwall, Gillingham, Kingstonian, Portadown, Barry Town, Tilbury and FC Torrevieja. He has also managed Barry Town, CD Jávea, and Tooting & Mitcham United and been assistant manager with Grays Athletic and Chelmsford City. Following the departure of Dean Holdsworth as manager of Chelmsford in November 2013, Brown became their caretaker manager.

His father, also called Ken, was also a professional footballer and managed Norwich City and Plymouth Argyle.

Career
Brown, a defender, began his career with Norwich City under the management of his father before playing for Plymouth Argyle, West Ham United, Huddersfield Town (loan), Reading (loan), Southend United (loan), Crystal Palace (loan), Birmingham City, Millwall, Gillingham, Kingstonian, Tilbury and Barry Town. He spent some time in Spain with FC Torrevieja before retiring from playing football. He famously scored the winning goal for West Ham United in a league match against Manchester United on 22 April 1992, handing Leeds United the impetus in that season's title race.

He was manager of CD Jávea, a Spanish regional league side who played in the Valenciana Regional Preferente Group IV from 2006 to 2009. Grays Athletic announced an offer had been put to Brown to become assistant manager to Julian Dicks on 18 September 2009. Jávea denied Brown had agreed terms two days later, before confirming his departure later that day. In the 2012–13 season he was lead development coach and first team coach at Barnet, departing at the end of the season.

In July 2013, Brown joined  Chelmsford City as assistant manager to Dean Holdsworth who was appointed in May 2013. Following a 6–0 defeat by Boreham Wood, Holdsworth left the club in November 2013 with Brown taking over as caretaker manager. Brown joined Dagenham & Redbridge FC as Academy Manager in July 2014  before moving to Millwall as head of coaching in February 2016.  Brown’s return to West Ham, commencing in January 2022 as coach to their under 9 to 14 age group was announced in December 2021.

References

External links
Career information at ex-canaries.co.uk
Player details at Welsh Premier Football

1967 births
Living people
Footballers from Barking, London
English footballers
Association football defenders
Norwich City F.C. players
Plymouth Argyle F.C. players
West Ham United F.C. players
Huddersfield Town A.F.C. players
Reading F.C. players
Southend United F.C. players
Crystal Palace F.C. players
Birmingham City F.C. players
Millwall F.C. players
Gillingham F.C. players
Kingstonian F.C. players
Portadown F.C. players
Barry Town United F.C. players
Tilbury F.C. players
CD Torrevieja players
English Football League players
Premier League players
NIFL Premiership players
Cymru Premier players
Isthmian League players
English expatriate footballers
English expatriate sportspeople in Spain
Expatriate footballers in Spain
English football managers
Barry Town United F.C. managers
Barnet F.C. non-playing staff
Chelmsford City F.C. managers
Cymru Premier managers
Isthmian League managers
National League (English football) managers
English expatriate football managers
Expatriate football managers in Spain
Association football coaches
Chelmsford City F.C. non-playing staff
Millwall F.C. non-playing staff
West Ham United F.C. non-playing staff